Asko Appliances AB was a Swedish company producing household appliances such as refrigerators, dishwashers and washing machines. It was based in Jung in Vara Municipality in Västergötland. Asko Appliances is now owned by Gorenje Group which is a part of Chinese major appliances manufacturer Hisense. The products continue to be sold in Sweden under the brand Cylinda and Asko. In North America, Asko imports only dishwashers and laundry appliances. Asko is upscale and competes against Bosch, Miele, SMEG, Viking Range,  Fulgor and Kitchen Aid.

History
The company was established in 1950 by Karl-Erik Andersson, whose first invention was a washing machine. The company started producing a fully automatic front-loading washing machine and a compact dishwasher in 1965, and started exporting their products in 1967. The original name was Junga Verkstäder, but after having been acquired by Asea in 1978, the name was changed to Asea Cylinda, later becoming ABB Cylinda after the merger of Asea with the Swiss Brown Boveri Corporation to form ABB. In 1984, they introduced the washing machines as we know of today: no springs, four shock absorbers and a door that directly connects to the outer drum, the latter being a unique design for domestic front loaders. The top loaders (only sold in Europe) also have four shock absorbers and no springs. The company was acquired by Finnish furniture manufacturer Asko (founded by Aukusti Heikki Asko-Avonius) in 1988. The name was also changed to Asko ASEA. Somewhere around 1992, ASEA was dropped from the name and it became Asko. Asko Appliances was acquired by the Italian Antonio Merloni Group in 2000.

With the acquisition of Asko Appliances the ownership of the Cylinda brand was kept within the corporate group of Asea, but in 1999 the name was changed from Asea Skandia to Elektroskandia. In 2008, Elektroskandia was acquired by the international company Sonepar. In July 2010 Asko Appliances was acquired by Slovenian Gorenje Group. Gorenje transferred production of all Asko appliances from Sweden to Slovenia in 2013. In June 2018, Chinese company Hisense acquired 95% majority in Gorenje Group. In February 2013, the washing machine and dryer production was moved to Velenje, Slovenia, and in July 2013 the dishwasher production was also moved. The development part was moved to Lidköping. In November 2022, Cylinda washing machines made in Turkey are sold.

Cylinda is still owned by Elektroskandia Sverige AB.

Timeline 

 1950 Establishment by Karl-Erik Andersson
 1965 Fully automatic washing machines and compact dishwasher introduced
 1967 Appliance export started
 1978 ASEA takeover, name changed to ASEA Cylinda
 1984 Introduction of the "Quattro" line of machines with four shock absorbers, no springs and a direct-connecting door, Asea starts selling washing machines and tumble dryers in The Netherlands
 1988 Takeover by ASKO, name changed to ASKO ASEA
 1992 Name change to ASKO, washing machine 20003 introduced with, a world's first for a domestic machine, frequency converter (FU) brushless motor, 44-liter machines refreshed, models 11003 and 12003 now with 1400 RPM.
 1994 44-liter washing machines and dryers refreshed, new control panel design
 1995 Final year for the 44-liter top load washing machines, final refresh of the 44-liter washing machines and related tumble dryers, all models now have an internal model number ending with A (i.e., 20005-WM200A) timer models now have hybrid timers, all models equipped with magnet drain pumps, control panel refreshed once again
 1998 50-liter machines introduced with an all-new design, still using Quattro. Door seal moved from outer tub to door
 2000 Takeover by Antonio Merloni
 2003 50-liter machines refreshed with DC brushless motors and 1800 RPM
 2006 50-liter machines final refresh, new control panel, 1800 RPM model dropped, drum spider material changed from Stainless Steel to cast Aluminium due to tolerance issues on high spin speed machines, bearing sealing cartridge changed accordingly

Notes

External links
 Official Swedish website
 USA website
 Official Cylinda website
 How Your ASKO Washing Machine Impacts California Drought Efforts, Infographic

Manufacturing companies of Sweden
Manufacturing companies established in 1950
1950 establishments in Sweden
Companies based in Västra Götaland County
Swedish brands